The 2005 Supercopa de España was a two-leg Spanish football match played on 13 and 20 August 2005. It was contested by 2004–05 La Liga champions Barcelona and 2004–05 Copa del Rey winners Real Betis. Barcelona won 4–2 on aggregate.

Match details

First leg

Second leg

References
List of Super Cup Finals 2005 RSSSF.com

Supercopa de Espana Final
Supercopa de España
Supercopa de Espana 2005
Supercopa de Espana 2005